Back to 1942 is a 2012 Chinese historical film directed by Feng Xiaogang. It is based on Liu Zhenyun's novel Remembering 1942, and is about a major famine in Henan, China, during the Second Sino-Japanese War. On 11 November 2012, the film premiered at the International Rome Film Festival. The film was selected as the Chinese entry for the Best Foreign Language Film at the 86th Academy Awards, but was not nominated.

Plot
The film is set in Henan, China in the winter of 1942, during the Second Sino-Japanese War. Master Fan is a wealthy landlord in a village in Henan. When the village is suffering from famine, Fan still has plenty of food to feed his family and the villagers. A group of bandits come and rob the village, eventually burning it down to the ground. Fan's son dies in the process of stopping the bandits.

Fan flees his hometown with his daughter, wife and daughter-in-law. They are accompanied by a servant, Shuanzhu. While they are fleeing to the west, they meet Xialu, a fellow villager, and the latter's family. They decide to travel together, but Fan's food supply and money are stolen by NRA soldiers amidst the chaos caused by Japanese bombing.

Brother Sim insists on preaching the Catholic faith in the starving province. After surviving a few Japanese bombings and witnessing many innocent people dying, he takes refuge under Father Megan but starts doubting the presence of God.

Meanwhile, Time correspondent Theodore H. White treks to Henan to investigate the famine. He discovers that while people are dying every day and some have even resorted to cannibalism, the Nationalist Government is still not doing anything to help the refugees. Chiang Kai-shek even wants to give up defending Henan, leaving the refugees to the Japanese. White's report is eventually published in the magazine, causing the Nationalist Government to make a U-turn on their policy. However, when relief supplies are being distributed in the province, the local officials and soldiers start fighting over who should receive a larger share.

The plight of Master Fan continues as his family members die one by one. He is eventually forced to sell his daughter into prostitution in return for food. Losing hope on life, he heads back to the east in the hope of dying somewhere near his home. On his way back, he meets a little girl who has just lost her mother. He adopts the girl as his granddaughter and they continue their journey.

Cast

 Zhang Guoli as Master Fan
 Chen Daoming as Chiang Kai-shek
 Li Xuejian as Li Peiji
 Zhang Hanyu as Brother Sim
 Fan Wei as Ma
 Feng Yuanzheng as Xialu
 Xu Fan as Huazhi
 Tim Robbins as Bishop Megan
 Adrien Brody as Theodore H. White
 Yao Jingyi as Lingdang
 Peng Jiale as Liubao
 Li Qian as Master Fan's daughter-in-law
 Yuan Huifang as Master Fan's wife
 Zhang Shaohua as Xialu's mother
 Wang Ziwen as Master Fan's daughter Xingxing
 Zhang Mo as Shuanzhu
 Zhao Yi as Master Fan's son
 Zhang Shu as Dong Jiayao
 Tian Xiaojie as middle-aged officer
 Ke Lan as Soong Mei-ling
 Zhang Guoqiang as Dong Yingbin
 Yu Zhen as Jiang Dingwen
 Chang Chen-kuang as Zhang Lisheng
 Lin Yongjian as County Magistrate Yue
 Duan Yihong as Chen Bulei
 Peter Noel Duhamel as Joseph Stilwell
 James A. Beattle as Clarence E. Gauss
 Luo Yang as Soong Ching-ling
 Qiao Zhenyu as Secretary Han
 Li Xiaozhou as Sun Ciwei
 Zhang Jie as Li Peiji's secretary
 Nathaniel Boyd as American embassy translator
 Chen Yusheng as Fang Ce
 Hao Jianmin as Zhang Guangyu
 Yu Genyi as Lu Daping
 Zhang Dongsheng as Luo Zhen
 Jiang Yanming as Luo Wu
 Zhang Zhijian as Zhang Fang
 Lü Zhong as Zhang Fang's mother
 Jie Bing as Li Fukuan
 Yasuyuki Hirata as Yasuji Okamura
 Kenichi Miura as Jirou Takahashi

Alec Su's scenes as T. V. Soong were deleted in the final cut of the film.

Reception
Back to 1942 received mixed reviews. It has a 40% approval rating on the review aggregator website Rotten Tomatoes, based on 10 reviews with an average rating of 5.2/10. Metacritic gave the film a score of 41/100 based on six reviews.

Xan Brooks of The Guardian wrote:

Dan Fainaru of Screen Daily wrote:

Giovanni Vimercati of the China Internet Information Center wrote:

Daniel Eagan of Film Journal wrote:

Neil Genzlinger of The New York Times wrote:

Awards
The film won the A.I.C. Award for Best Cinematography during its premiere at the International Rome Film Festival in November 2012, and the Golden Butterfly Award.

The movie won both Best Feature Film Award and Visual Effects Award at the 13th Beijing International Film Festival in 2013.

It also won the Best Film of Mainland and Taiwan at the 32nd Hong Kong Film Awards in 2013.

See also
 Chinese famine of 1942-43
 List of Chinese submissions for the Academy Award for Best Foreign Language Film
 List of submissions to the 86th Academy Awards for Best Foreign Language Film

References

External links
 

2012 films
English-language Chinese films
Films set in 1942
Films set in Henan
Films directed by Feng Xiaogang
Second Sino-Japanese War films
Films based on Chinese novels
2012 war drama films
Chinese historical drama films
Chinese war drama films
2010s historical drama films
2010s Mandarin-language films
2010s English-language films
2010s Japanese-language films
Films about famine
Huayi Brothers films
IMAX films
Films with screenplays by Liu Zhenyun
Cultural depictions of Chiang Kai-shek
2012 drama films